David Feldman is an American stand-up comedian, comedy writer, and podcaster.

In 2009, Feldman launched the listener-supported David Feldman Show (formerly known as the David Feldman Comedy Podcast), which includes a diverse mixture of live and prerecorded content. In November 2013, he released a special digital download compilation album called The Very Best of the David Feldman Show, Vol. 1.<ref>{{cite web |url=https://www.amazon.com/Very-Best-David-Feldman-Explicit/dp/B00GOWCVN2 |title=The Very Best of the David Feldman Show, Vol. 1 |website=Amazon.com}}</ref>

He has also written on ABC's Roseanne, HBO's Dennis Miller Live, HBO's Real Time with Bill Maher, Comedy Central's The Daily Show with Jon Stewart, and Fox's Talk Show With Spike Feresten. He co-hosts the Ralph Nader Radio Hour with Ralph Nader and Steve Skrovan, distributed via the Pacifica Radio Network.

Feldman has also written for The Academy Awards, The Emmys, Triumph the Insult Comic Dog, and countless roasts on Comedy Central. Over the past few years he has written with (and for) Steve Martin, Martin Short, Robin Williams, Nathan Lane, Robert Smigel and Bette Midler.

As a comedian, Feldman has appeared frequently on Late Night with Conan O'Brien, The Tonight Show and The Late Late Show, as well as his own special for Comedy Central. Feldman has also done commentary for Salon magazine.

Feldman began as a stand-up comic in San Francisco and currently resides in New York City. He has "about" six kids and has several ex-wives. Feldman spoke at Pitzer College's 2009 Commencement Ceremony and released an album in the same year called Left Without Paying''.

Feldman has won three Primetime Emmys for comedy writing (1995, 1996 and 1998), four Writers Guild Awards (1996, 1999, 2001 and 2017), and a CableACE Award (1995).

He is a Democrat who has written jokes pro bono for candidates he supports. Feldman is a graduate of Dwight Morrow High School in Englewood, New Jersey, and Columbia University in New York City.

References

External links 

 

Living people
American podcasters
American television writers
American male television writers
American stand-up comedians
American male comedians
21st-century American comedians
Place of birth missing (living people)
Year of birth missing (living people)
Primetime Emmy Award winners
American political writers
American male non-fiction writers
American comedy writers
Columbia University alumni
Writers Guild of America Award winners
Dwight Morrow High School alumni
People from Englewood, New Jersey
Screenwriters from New Jersey
21st-century American screenwriters
21st-century American male writers